The International Honor Quilt (also known as the International Quilting Bee) is a collective feminist art project initiated in 1980 by Judy Chicago as a companion piece to The Dinner Party. The piece is a collection of 539 two-foot-long quilted triangles that honor women from around the world. Through the Flower, Chicago's not-for-profit organization,  gifted the collection to University of Louisville Hite Art Institute in 2013 to be available for research and to exhibit.

Background

Creation 
In Judy Chicago's autobiography, Beyond the Flower, she discusses initiating the International Quilting Bee, stating that "people would be invited to submit their triangular quilts. . .honoring women of their own determination. By doing this, I intended to provide an opportunity for community participation and also to counter another criticism that had emerged, this time about my choices of women."

Community collaboration 
Individual Quilt panels were often created by groups of women after viewing or hearing about Chicago's Dinner Party . For example, a group from the Chrysallis Center at Saginaw Valley State University, Michigan, visited the Dinner Party exhibition in Chicago in 1981. Returning to Saginaw via bus that evening, they decided they needed to create a quilt panel and submit it to the project.  Under the leadership of Rosalie (Riegle) Troester,  an English instructor at the University, and Trish Nowicke, Campus Minister, a group of fourteen students created a multicolored butterfly wing (IQB-352) representing the growth stage it symbolizes as well as the student career counseling and  support center of which they were members. They completed the project and forwarded their creation to Through the Flower for display in the next Dinner Party venue, Montreal.

Description 
The International Honor Quilt is a collection of 539 panels of triangular quilts honoring women, women's organizations, and women's issues.

Women represented

Mythological, religious, fictional 
 Isis
 Virgin Mary
 Eve
 Deborah
 Loch Ness Monster
 Demeter
 Persephone
 Nancy Drew

Well-known women 

 Imogen Cunningham 
 Helen Keller 
 Louise Nevelson 
 Annie Oakley 
 Mother Teresa
 Mary Cassatt
 Frida Kahlo
 Abigail Adams
 Billie Jean King
 Pearl S. Buck
 Agatha Christie
 Elizabeth II
 Sonia Delaunay
 Marie Stopes
 Maria Montessori
 Joan Baez
 Anne Frank
 Joan of Arc
 Eleanor Roosevelt
 Winnie Madikizela-Mandela
 Corrie ten Boom
 Nikki Giovanni
 Margaret Sanger
 The Pointer Sisters
 Betty Friedan
 Marie Curie
 Paula Modersohn-Becker
 Emily Brontë
 Anna Pavlova
 Judy Chicago
 Anaïs Nin
 Kathe Kollwitz
 Florence Nightingale
 Rachel Carson
 Georgia O'Keeffe
 Sojourner Truth
 Sandra Day O'Connor
 Margaret Atwood
 Janis Joplin
 Gertrude Stein
 Eva Hesse
 Jane Addams
 Isadora Duncan
 Edna St. Vincent Millay
 Joy Adamson
 Lorena Hickok
 Ellen Powell Tiberino
 Pearl Chase
 Nellie McClung
 Emily Carr
 Fumiko Kaneko
 Ana Lupas
 Ruth Asawa
 Vonda N. McIntyre
 Sophie Scholl
 Emmy Noether
 Rebecca Nurse
 Dame Cicely Saunders
 Emma Lazarus
 Hannah Szenes
 Chiang Ching
 Nancy Crow
 Katie Sandwina
 Mary Daly
 Mary Anning

Women's groups and organizations 
 Shakers
 American Association of University Women (A.U.W.) (several panels)
 National Organization for Women (N.O.W.) (several panels)
 League of Women Voters
 East Bay Heritage Quilters

Countries represented 
Women from around the world wanted to be a part of the feminist spirit of The Dinner Party as it toured.  Twelve countries are represented with over 136 known municipalities. The University of Louisville's Digital Archives has detailed information about locations of all the quilt pieces.

 United States –  (35 known locations)
 Canada – 105
 Australia  – 30 (21 known locations)
 Germany – 27
 England – 12
 India – 5
 Austria – 3
 Scotland – 3
 Romania – 2
 South Africa – 2
 Israel – 1
 Japan – 1

References 

Quilts
Feminist art
Feminism and history
1980 works
Installation art
Textile arts of the United States